The following wineries and vineyards operate wholly or principally in the U.S. state of Illinois.  The article for Illinois wine provides an overview of the industry.

See also
List of breweries in Illinois

References

External links
Illinois Grape Growers and Vintners Association

 

Illinois-related lists
Illinois
Wineries
Illinois